Lidija Mihajlović (born September 23, 1968) is a Serbian sport shooter. 

Mihajlović was born in Niš (SR Serbia, SFR Yugoslavia) and began her shooting career at SK "NIŠ 1881" in her native city. She is currently coached by Zoran Stojiljković. 

She has participated at the 1992 Summer Olympics in Barcelona as an Independent Olympic Participant, due to the country of FR Yugoslavia being under United Nations sanctions which prevented the country from taking part in the Olympics. However, individual Yugoslav athletes were allowed to take part as Independent Olympic Participants. She represented Serbia at the 2008 Summer Olympics in Beijing, People's Republic of China, as she gained qualification for two different events. She finished 7th in the 50 metre rifle three positions event.

During her career, she has won five international medals (four silver, one gold) and also two European medals (one silver, one bronze).

Mihajlović gained her qualification to the 2008 Summer Olympics by taking 4th place at the 2006 ISSF World Shooting Championships in Zagreb, Croatia.

External links
Lidija Mihajlović profile at the Olympic Committee of Serbia website
Lidija Mihajlović profile at SrbijaSport.com

1968 births
Serbian female sport shooters
ISSF rifle shooters
Shooters at the 1992 Summer Olympics
Shooters at the 2008 Summer Olympics
Olympic shooters as Independent Olympic Participants
Olympic shooters of Serbia
Sportspeople from Niš
Living people